Neoconocephalus triops, the broad-tipped conehead, is a species of Conocephalus fuscus in the family Tettigoniidae. It is found in the Caribbean and North America.

References

External links

 

triops
Articles created by Qbugbot
Insects described in 1758
Taxa named by Carl Linnaeus